New Generation Pictures, Inc. is a production company specializing in voice recording for anime and video games.

Production list

Anime

ADR Production
 3x3 Eyes (Geneon)
 Amazing Nurse Nanako (Geneon)
 Angel Tales (Bandai Entertainment)
 Dangaizer 3 (Right Stuf)
 Bayonetta: Bloody Fate (Funimation)
 Daphne in the Brilliant Blue (Geneon)
 DearS (Geneon)
 Diary of Our Days at the Breakwater (Funimation)
 Ergo Proxy (Geneon)
 Eureka Seven: Hi-Evolution (Funimation)
 Anemone: Eureka Seven Hi-Evolution (Funimation)
 Ghost Talker's Daydream (Geneon)
 Girls Bravo (Geneon)
 Gun Sword (Geneon)
 Haibane Renmei (Geneon)
 Hellsing (TV Series: Geneon, Ultimate: Geneon [Eps. 1-4], Funimation [Eps. 5-10])
 I's (Viz Media)
 Ikki Tousen (Season 1: Geneon, Seasons 3-4: Funimation)
 Kamichu! (Geneon)
 King's Raid: Successors of the Will (Funimation)
 Koi Kaze (Geneon)
 Licensed by Royalty (Geneon)
 The Melody of Oblivion (Geneon)
 Mermaid Forest (Geneon)
 Muhyo & Roji's Bureau of Supernatural Investigation (Funimation)
 Nazca (Geneon)
 NieA 7 (Geneon)
 Paranoia Agent (Geneon)
 R.O.D. The TV (Geneon)
 Rumic Theater (Geneon)
 Spirit of Wonder Scientific Boys Club (Bandai Entertainment)
 Starship Girl Yamamoto Yohko (Right Stuf)
 Strawberry Eggs (Geneon)
 Street Fighter IV: The Ties that Bind (Capcom)
 Super Milk Chan (Pilot; Geneon)
 Texhnolyze (Geneon)

Translation and subtitling
 Agent Aika (Central Park Media)
 Beautiful Beast (Central Park Media)
 Bio Hunter (Urban Vision)
 The Cockpit (Urban Vision)
 DNA Sights 999.9 (Urban Vision)
 Fencer of Minerva (Central Park Media)
 Four Play (Central Park Media)
 Future GPX Cyber Formula (Bandai Entertainment)
 Gatchaman (Urban Vision)
 Geobreeders (Central Park Media)
 Goku: Midnight Eye (Urban Vision)
 Golgo 13 series (Urban Vision)
 The Hakkenden (Geneon)
 Hurricane Polymar (Urban Vision)
 I Dream of Mimi (Right Stuf)
 Judge (Central Park Media)
 Kishin Corps (Geneon)
 Labyrinth of Flames (Central Park Media)
 Maetel Legend (Central Park Media)
 Magical Girl Pretty Sammy (Geneon)
 Maze (Central Park Media)
 Mystery of the Necronomicon (Central Park Media)
 Ninja Scroll (TV Series) (Urban Vision)
 Pet Shop of Horrors (Urban Vision)
 Sailor Victory (Media Blasters)
 Saint Tail (Tokyopop)
 Scorpion's Revenge (Central Park Media)
 Sherlock Hound (Geneon)
 Spaceship Agga Ruter (Central Park Media)
 StrayDog: Kerberos Panzer Cops (Bandai Entertainment)
 Sumo Vixens (Central Park Media)
 Talking Head (Bandai Entertainment)
 Tekkaman Blade (Urban Vision)
 Tenchi Muyo! Ryo-Ohki (Geneon)
 Terminatrix (Central Park Media)
 The Red Spectacles (Bandai)
 Tokyo Mafia series (Central Park Media)
 Twilight of the Dark Master (Urban Vision)
 Vampire Hunter D (Urban Vision)
 Vampire Princess Miyu (Tokyopop)
 Weather Woman (Central Park Media)
 Wicked City (Urban Vision)
 Wild 7 (Urban Vision)
 Wrath of the Ninja (Central Park Media)

Video games
Aliens vs. Pinball (Zen Studios)
CastleStorm (Zen Studios)
Conception Plus (Spike Chunsoft)
Dark Rose Valkyrie (Idea Factory)
Dawn of Mana (Square Enix)
Demon Gaze (NIS America)
Demon Gaze 2 (NIS America)
Dragon Star Varnir (Idea Factory)
Final Fantasy Crystal Chronicles: The Crystal Bearers (Square Enix)
Final Fantasy Fables: Chocobo's Dungeon (Square Enix)
Final Fantasy IV (Nintendo DS) (Square Enix)
God Wars: Future Past (NIS America)
The Guided Fate Paradox (NIS America)
Infinite Undiscovery (Square Enix)
Jurassic Park Interactive (Vivendi Universal Games)
KickBeat (Zen Studios)
The Last Remnant (Square Enix)
The Lost Child (NIS America)
Lufia: Curse of the Sinistrals (Natsume)
Marvel Dimension of Heroes (Lenovo)
Marvel Heroes (Gazillion Entertainment)
Marvel vs. Capcom 3: Fate of Two Worlds (Capcom)
Ultimate Marvel vs. Capcom 3 (Capcom)
Marvel vs. Capcom: Infinite (Capcom)
Marvel Pinball (Zen Studios)
Mega Man 11 (Capcom)
MeiQ: Labyrinth of Death (Idea Factory)
Natural Doctrine (NIS America)
Operation Abyss: New Tokyo Legacy (NIS America)
Rodea the Sky Soldier (NIS America)
Romancing SaGa (Square Enix)
Rune Factory 3 (Natsume)
Rune Factory: Tides of Destiny (Natsume)
Star Ocean: The Last Hope (Square Enix)
Street Fighter IV (Capcom)
Super Street Fighter IV (Capcom)
Street Fighter V (Capcom)
Street Fighter V: Arcade Edition (Capcom)
Street Fighter V: Championship Edition (Capcom)
Street Fighter X Tekken (Capcom)
Teppen (GungHo Online Entertainment)
Time Crisis 4 (Bandai Namco Games)
Trillion: God of Destruction (Idea Factory)
Valkyrie Profile: Covenant of the Plume (Square Enix)
Valkyrie Profile: Lenneth (Square Enix)
Valkyrie Profile 2: Silmeria (Square Enix)
Witch's Wish (Natsume)
Zen Pinball (Zen Studios)

References

External links
 Official website
 
 New Generation Pictures at Crystalacids Database

Anime companies
Companies based in Beverly Hills, California
Dubbing studios
Mass media companies established in 1992
Recording studios in California